Pak Yong-il (1966 – September 2022) was a North Korean politician, who served as chairman of the Central Committee of the Korean Social Democratic Party as of 28 August 2019 and vice chairman of the Standing Committee of the Supreme People's Assembly. 

Pak Yong-il was born in North Korea in 1966. He attended Kim Il-sung University. 

Pak Yong-il became a member of the Peace and Unity Committee, and later became Deputy Chairman of the Peace and Unity Committee in March 2018. He became a member of the Central Committee of the Korean Red Cross in August 2006. He took part in negotiations of the Korean Red Cross representing North Korea.  He succeeded Kim Yong-dae as the chairman of the Central Committee of the Social Democratic Party of Korea and Vice President of the Presidium of the Supreme People's Assembly on 28 August 2019.

On 20 September 2022, North Korean state media reported that leader Kim Jong-un sent a wreath the day before to express condolences over Pak Yong-il's death.

References 

1966 births
2022 deaths
Date of birth  missing
Date of death missing
Place of death missing
Kim Il-sung University alumni
Korean Social Democratic Party politicians
Members of the Supreme People's Assembly
North Korean politicians